Julius Mayreder (26 June 1860 – 15 January 1911) was an Austrian architect.

Early life
Mayreder was born the son of Leopold (1823–1892), a restaurateur and hotelier, and Henriette Rettmeyer (1834–1923). His siblings were Karl Mayreder (1856–1935), also a prominent Austrian architect; and Rudolf (1865–1937), a lawyer, civil engineer, and contractor. He married Marie Einsle (1873–1958) in 1904 and had a son, Frederick (1905–1954), also an architect.

Education
From 1878 to 1880, Mayreder studied at the Technical University in Vienna, but left after two years to pursue greater artistic freedom. From 1880 to 1882, he was a student at a Kunstgewerbeschule (school of arts and crafts). Between 1883 and 1886, he studied at the Academy of Fine Arts Vienna (Akademie der bildenden Künste) under Friedrich von Schmidt. In 1887, he traveled in Greece, Constantinople, Italy, Germany, and France on a Prix de Rome scholarship, awarded to promising arts students.

Career
Mayreder began work in the offices of the architects Victor Luntz and Adolf Lang (in Budapest) in 1888. In 1890, he worked in the architectural studio of Franz von Neumann. Beginning in 1891, he worked as an independent architect.

He collaborated frequently with his brothers Karl and Rudolf. In 1893, they won a competition to manage construction in Stubenviertel, close to Vienna's historic city center. They also won second prize for a project to manage construction in all of Vienna.

Mayreder designed many buildings, both residential and industrial. As an architect, Mayreder favored a Baroque style. He was also a founding member of the Vienna Secession in 1897.

Mayreder died in 1911 of a brain disease. He is buried at Zentralfriedhof, the "central cemetery" of Vienna.

Selected works
 1894, Cemetery chapel, Bystřice pod Hostýnem
 1895, Villa Schenker, Vienna (no longer exists)
 1896, tombs of Spitzer Lukasc and the Schenker Family, Heiligenstadt cemetery, Vienna
 1898–1899, Villa Ernst Regenhart, Czech Republic 
 1900-1901, "Zum Herrnhuter" ("Moravians house"), residential and commercial building, Vienna
 c. 1901, Tilgner Fountain, Vienna
 1902, House, Naglergasse 6, Vienna
 1902, Vienna Bicycle Club, Vienna (no longer exists)
 1905, Pension Fortino, Grado, Friuli-Venezia Giulia, Italy
 c. 1906, Home of Rudolf Mayreder (brother), Dürnstein

Gallery

References
 M. Ritter v. Doderer: "Nachruf." In: Monatsschrift Wr. Bauhütte 5.1911, Nr.2, S.18f 
 F. Borsi / E. Godoli: Wiener Bauten der Jahrhundertwende. Stuttgart 1985 
 ÖKT 44: G. Hajos: Die Profanbauten des III., IV., und V. Bezirks. Wien 1980
 A. Kieslinger: "Die Steine der Wiener Ringstraße." In: R. Wagner-Rieger (Hg.): Die Wiener Ringstraße. Bild einer Epoche Bd.4 Wiesbaden 1972
 P. Kortz: Wien am Anfang des 20. Jahrhunderts. 2 Bde., Wien 1906
 A. Lehne: Jugendstil in Wien, Wien 1989 
 A. Moravansky: Die Architektur der Donaumonarchie. Berlin 1988 
 Neubauten in Österreich, o.J. Wien 
 M. Paul: Technischer Führer durch Wien. Wien 1906 
 E. Springer: "Geschichte und Kulturleben der Wiener Ringstraße." In: R. Wagner-Rieger (Hg.): Die Wiener Ringstraße. Bild einer Epoche Bd.2 Wiesbaden 1979
 P. Steines: Hunderttausend Steine. Grabstätten gr. Österreicher jüd. Konf. a.d. Wr. Zentralfriedhof Tor 1 u. Tor 4. Wien 1993
 R. Wagner-Rieger: Wiens Architektur im 19. Jahrhundert. Wien 1970
 Wiener Neubauten im Style der Sezession. Fassaden, Details, Haustore, Vestibüle. Wien 1902 
 M. Wehdorn: "Die Bautechnik der Wiener Ringstraße." In: Die Wiener Ringstraße. Bild einer Epoche. Bd.11, Wiesbaden 1979 
 M. Wehdorn / U. Georgeacopol-Winischhofer: Baudenkmäler der Technik und Industrie in Österreich. Bd.1 Wien u.a. 1984

External links
 

1860 births
1911 deaths
Austrian architects
Vienna Secession architects
Academy of Fine Arts Vienna alumni
Artists from Vienna